ATK Mohun Bagan Football Club is an Indian professional football club based in Kolkata, West Bengal. The club competes in Indian Super League, the top flight of Indian football.
The club, which was formed as a merger between the football section of the multi-sports club Mohun Bagan AC and ATK FC , began to play in the ISL from 2020–21 season as ATK Mohun Bagan FC. Later on 18th March owner Sanjiv Goenka announced the team will be renaming as Mohun Bagan Super Giants

The principal owner of ATK Mohun Bagan is Sanjiv Goenka led consortium called Kolkata Games & Sports with Mohun Bagan AC serving as the co-owner. Mohun Bagan continues to share a fierce rivalry, known as the Boro Match, with Mohun Bagan's long-time city rival East Bengal. The first derby match was played on 8 August 1921. The Mariners also have a considerate rivalry with the big clubs from Kerala; namely Gokulam Kerala and Kerala Blasters.

The principal club owner, Sanjeev Goenka, announced after winning the 2023 Indian Super League Final that ATK Mohun Bagan will be rebranded as Mohun Bagan Super Giants from the next season, after the completion of the current 2022-23 season.

Background

History
On 15 August 1889 Mohun Bagan Athletic Club was founded as Mohun Bagan Sporting Club under the patronage of the three famous aristocratic Bengali families of North Kolkata – Mitra family, Basu family and Sen family. The club's first notable achievement came on 29 July 1911 when Mohun Bagan defeated East Yorkshire Regiment in the final of IFA Shield, which was then the most prestigious football tournament in India. With Mohun Bagan's victory it became the first native team to win the Shield and also a symbol of nationalism during the Indian independence movement, making the headlines in numerous newspapers in India as well as in the UK. The club continued to make immense contributions in Indian football throughout the history, thereby earning the title of "National Club of India" from the Prime Minister Rajiv Gandhi in his speech at the centenary year event, and was honoured by a postage stamp from the Government of India.

In 1996 the club was one of the founding members of India's first domestic league, National Football League (NFL), which later got rebranded as I-League in 2007.
 In 1998, United Spirits, a subsidiary of Vijay Mallya owned United Breweries Group, entered into a partnership with Mohun Bagan by buying a 50% stake in the club's football division and formed a joint-venture entity named United Mohun Bagan Private Limited. For the first time the club was transformed into a corporate establishment from a society status, and the name of the club's football division was thus changed to McDowell's Mohun Bagan FC.

In 2014 All India Football Federation (AIFF), along with IMG–Reliance and Star Sports, launched a franchise football league, Indian Super League (ISL). A consortium, named Kolkata Games and Sports Pvt. Ltd., of former Indian cricketer Sourav Ganguly, along with businessmen like Harshavardhan Neotia, Sanjiv Goenka and Utsav Parekh, and La Liga side Atlético Madrid, won the bid for the Kolkata franchise to play in ISL. The franchise became the first team to officially launch, as Atlético de Kolkata on 7 May 2014, and went on to win the first ISL. This year also marked the 125 years of Mohun Bagan, which was celebrated the following year with much vigor as they won their first I-League title in 2015. In 2017 Atlético Madrid ended their partnership with Atlético de Kolkata selling their ownership stake to Goenka and the franchise was then rebranded as ATK FC. The same year Mohun Bagan ended its partnership with United Breweries after a long period of internal disputes and court proceedings.

A roadmap, jointly planned out by AIFF, FSDL and the clubs of I-League and ISL, to gradually recognise ISL as the only top-tier league of India by 2023, was agreed upon in 2019, and it also included an option to allow two I-League clubs to join ISL by 2022, henceforth Mohun Bagan and East Bengal were decided to be the ones to be included. During the 130th anniversary that year, Mohun Bagan was inducted into the Club of Pioneers, a network of the oldest existing football clubs around the world, on Mohun Bagan Day (29 July). Year 2020 became a significant year for both teams as Mohun Bagan won its fifth league title to become the joint most successful club in the league's history and ATK won its third ISL final. After the combined efforts by ISL organisers to include Mohun Bagan, the ownership group of ATK decided to disband the team and buy majority stake in Mohun Bagan's football division to form a merged entity named ATK Mohun Bagan Private Limited. The team was rebranded and launched as ATK Mohun Bagan FC on 10 July 2020, after a month of delay due to the COVID-19 pandemic.

Seasons

2020–21

Most of players in the newly formed team for the ISL continued from the last ATK squad, including the five foreigners – Roy Krishna, David Williams, Edu García, Carl McHugh and Tiri, and the coaching staff led by Antonio López Habas. The biggest signing of the club in its debut ISL season was the veteran Indian defender Sandesh Jhingan. The team was led by five different captains – Pritam Kotal, Roy Krishna, Sandesh Jhingan, Arindam Bhattacharya and Edu Garcia, as decided by Habas. The club narrowly lost the ISL Premiership on the last matchday as well as the ISL Championship in the final, both to Mumbai City but ATK Mohun Bagan became joint most points earner in a single season. Roy Krishna was declared the joint top scorer of the season with 14 goals in 23 matches and Arindam Bhattacharya won the Golden Glove of the season with 10 cleansheets in 23 matches. At the continental stage, ATK Mohun Bagan dominated the AFC Cup group stage, but eventually lost the inter-zone play-off semi-final to Nasaf Qarshi.

2021–22

In the 2021–22 season, the club withdrew from the Calcutta Premier Division and also refused to participate in the Durand Cup due to unavailability of first team players and lack of a reserve team. Prior to the start of 2021–22 season, Sourav Ganguly, one of the co-owners of ATK Mohun Bagan Pvt. Ltd. decided to step away from his role in the club in order to avoid conflict of interests with the club's principal owner and chairman, Sanjiv Goenka. The club made some of the big transfers of 2021 in Indian football that included, Liston Colaco for around $161K and Hugo Boumous for more than $250K. ATK Mohun Bagan also signed a Finnish midfielder Joni Kauko, who had recently played in UEFA Euro 2020. On 18 December, Habas announced his decision to resign from his duty as the head coach of the team after a winless run of 4 matches including their biggest loss in the league till then. On 19 December, Goa president announced that ATK Mohun Bagan signed their head coach Juan Ferrando, through a buyout clause that possibly made him highest paid coach in ISL. ATK Mohun Bagan matched Goa's 15 matches unbeaten streak until they lost against Jameshedpur and finished 3rd in the league table. In the ISL play-offs, they lost against Hyderabad on aggregate score in the semifinals. The club easily managed to qualify for the AFC Cup group stage through the qualifying play-offs, and eventually booked a spot in the inter-zone play-off semi-finals.

Club culture

Crest
The Sailing Boat of Mohun Bagan and its iconic green-maroon colours were retained in the club's logo by the newly merged consortium. The sailboat signifies Mohun Bagan's place of establishment: North Calcutta, on the banks of the Ganges. In fact Calcutta was the capital during the later 19th century and a prime trade center of British India, where the primary mode of transportation was through the waterways. The colours of the crest has its connection to the representation of the Sundarbans in the earliest crest design of Mohun Bagan.

Colours
At the club's first board of directors meeting after the merger on 10 July 2020, it was announced that the club would retain the traditional colours of Mohun Bagan – green and maroon – as their official club colours.

On 12 November at the official unveiling of the kits for the 2020–21 season, the released kits followed the traditional colour schemes of Mohun Bagan, green and maroon home kit and a white dominant away kit, with a "Champions" tag below the club crest in honour of the successful preceding season for both Mohun Bagan and ATK in their respective leagues. The home kit design followed the traditional striped shirt of green maroon and maroon shorts, and the away kit was a white shirt of four green and maroon narrow bands through the middle and white shorts. The kit designs were continued for the next season as well.

The third kit of the team wasn't released until 29 December 2020 when the club fielded the team against Chennaiyin FC donning a black and grey striped jersey. The third kit was a resemblance of ATK's 2019–20 away colours, which was discontinued in the next season due to controversies and backlash from the supporters.

Ownership
The club is owned by ATK Mohun Bagan Pvt. Ltd., which was formed as a merger of a consortium of Sanjiv Goenka, Utsav Parekh and Sourav Ganguly owned Kolkata Games & Sports Pvt. Ltd. and Mohun Bagan Football Club Pvt. Ltd.. While Kolkata Games & Sports holds 80% of stakes in ATK Mohun Bagan, Mohun Bagan serves as minority stakeholders with 20% of stakes ATK Mohun Bagan FC continues with the existing registration of Mohun Bagan AC in the All India Football Federation and the Indian Football Association.

Kit suppliers and sponsors

Supporters

Since the establishment of Mohun Bagan in 1889, the club had been distinctly supported by dedicated and loyal fans, known as 'Mariners''', across the nation, which also includes various high-profile personalities. The principal owner and chairman of the club, Dr. Sanjiv Goenka, was himself an ardent follower of the club, belonging to a family of Mohun Bagan supporters. In his first interview after the merger he said, "When I grew up, Green and Maroon was very much part of my being." The co-owner of the club, Sourav Ganguly had even played for the club's cricket team for many years in the past.

Historically, Mohun Bagan had had record average home attendances in a number of I-League seasons. In the 2014-15 I-League season, their vocal support in away matches in Pune, Mumbai and Bengaluru was arguably unseen in Indian football until then. In 2015 an all-female supporters' group, called Lady Mariners, was established. The group became India's first all-female football supporter's club. Around 2016, ultras of Mariners, called Mariners' Base Camp, was formed with its various wings spread all around India, to revolutionize the Indian football fan movement through tifos, chants, slogans and pyrotechnics. In March 2020, a digital fanbase called Mariners' Arena became the first fan club in West Bengal to launch their official fan merchandise.

The merger of ATK with Mohun Bagan was met with harshly negative reception among the Mariners, followed by numerous protests around the city, digitally as well as on streets.<ref>{{Cite web|title=Mohun Bagan Fans & Members' Forum Wants To 'Break The Merger  The Fan Garage (TFG)|url=https://thefangarage.com/articles/18098-mohun-bagan-fans-and-members-forum-wants-to-break-the-merger|access-date=2022-02-25|website=thefangarage.com|date=10 September 2021 |language=en|archive-date=25 February 2022|archive-url=https://web.archive.org/web/20220225093612/https://thefangarage.com/articles/18098-mohun-bagan-fans-and-members-forum-wants-to-break-the-merger|url-status=live}}</ref> The fans feared that the merger would become a mark of their 'mother club' and its century-old legacy's conclusion. Gradually as the air of doubts were cleared, the resentment was calmed, though few ultras continued to voice their demands with hard statements. Regardless, the club received considerable support with members of numerous fan clubs actively participating in ISL Fan Wall during ATK Mohun Bagan's matches in its debut season. During the club's 2022 AFC Cup group stage matches, an average of 33,371 fans attended the matches under a limited crowd capacity due to COVID-19 pandemic in India.

Stadiums

Vivekananda Yuba Bharati Krirangan

ATK Mohun Bagan plays its home matches at Vivekananda Yuba Bharati Krirangan, commonly called Salt Lake Stadium, located in the suburb of Bidhannagar in Kolkata. A multi-purpose stadium owned by the Government of West Bengal under Youth Affairs and Sports Department, the VYKB primarily hosts football matches, apart from occasional track and field events. The stadium was built in 1984, predominately for matches like Kolkata Derby that featured attendance too huge for the grounds in Maidan to accommodate. Before its renovation in 2011, it was the largest football stadium in the world by capacity of 120,000. Prior to the construction and opening of Rungrado 1st of May Stadium in 1989, it was the largest football stadium in the world. It is currently the fourth largest sports stadium in Asia by capacity. The gigantic stadium features three tiers of concrete galleries with nine entry gates, including a VIP gate, and 30 ramps for the spectators to reach the viewing blocks. 2022 AFC Cup preliminary round 2 was the first match that the team played at VYBK, since the merger happened during the restrictive situation due to COVID-19 pandemic in 2020.

Mohun Bagan Ground

The Mohun Bagan Ground, located in the urban park of Maidan near Mohun Bagan's club tent and opposite to the Eden Gardens, is operated by Mohun Bagan's football division. Historically, the ground was regularly used by the club to play major tournaments and numerous significant matches until it was merely used as a training field and mostly play minor tournaments. By installing floodlights at the ground in 1977, Mohun Bagan had become the first club in Maidan to do so, and they were first operated during an exhibition match against Pakhtakor Tashkent on 10 February 1977. The ground facilities were also used for training by Atlético de Kolkata during 2015 Indian Super League, and since 2017–18 season the ground had been used for Mohun Bagan's I-League home matches after an upgrade of the stadium. The stadium has galleries on three sides and a rampart on the fourth side. The north side, a contemporary gallery of the stadium, having bucket seats installed for the members of the club. In 2022, after the merger, ATK Mohun Bagan renovated the stadium in the lines of Vivekananda Yuba Bharati Krirangan with artificial turf and upgraded amenities so that it can be used for their home matches in Indian Super League and other big tournaments when required. Since the merger in 2020, the first match that the team played was a friendly fixture against Chennaiyin in August 2022.

Rivalry with East Bengal

Kolkata Derby or the Boro Match is a football match between ATK Mohun Bagan FC (previously Mohun Bagan AC) and its city rival East Bengal Club. The rivalry was born out of a social tension between the two cultural groups of Bengalis in Kolkata: the Ghotis (nativists) and the Bangals (migrants), that eventually led to the formation of East Bengal Club as a representation of the Bangals, and hence the Derby. The first match between the two sides was played on 8 August 1921 in the Coochbehar Cup semifinal that ended in a goalless draw. Mohun Bagan won the replayed semifinal by 3–0 score. The goals in the first ever derby were scored by Rabi Ganguly, Poltu Dasgupta and Abhilash Ghosh.

Till 25 February 2023, 384 matches have been played between the two teams out of which ATK Mohun Bagan has won 127 matches and East Bengal won 132 matches, the rest ended with a draw.

After the merger, the first encounter was in the 2nd match-week of ISL on 27 November 2020 at Tilak Maidan in Goa, where ATK Mohun Bagan beat East Bengal by a margin of 2–0. Roy Krishna and Manvir Singh were the goal-scorers for ATK Mohun Bagan.

The two clubs currently meet at least twice a year in Indian Super League and once a year in Calcutta Football League.

Players

First-team squad

Other players under contract

Out on loan

Reserve squad

Current technical staff

Current coaching staff

Current board members

Recent seasons

Since 2020

Performance in AFC competitions

as ATK Mohun Bagan FC

Youth Team Seasons

Stats

Records and statistics

Manegerial record

Top goalscorers

Top goalkeepers

Honours

Domestic
 Indian Super League
 Premiership
 Runners-up: 2020–21
 Championship
 Winners: 2022–23
 Runners-up: 2020–21

eSports

In July 2020, the club formed an eSports team to compete in the eISL, which plays the FIFA video games.

References

External links

 Team profile at Indian Super League
 Team profile at Global Sports Archive
 Team profile at eISL
  (official channel)

ATK Mohun Bagan FC
Mohun Bagan AC
ATK (football club)
RPSG Group
2020 establishments in West Bengal
Association football clubs established in 2020
Indian Super League teams
Football clubs in Kolkata